Bolton Hockey Club is a Men’s, Ladies and Juniors Field Hockey Club Based in Greater Manchester, England.

About 

It has over 180 members of which approximately 140 are playing members. This includes players from the 3 Men's Teams, 3 Ladies Teams, 6 Junior Teams ranging from U11 to U18 boys and Girl’s, 1 mix team, a Veterans Team and also some touring sides made up from various members from any team as required.

Bolton Hockey Club was the 2nd Club in Greater Manchester to be awarded the Clubs1st and Clubmark Awards.

International players 
One of Bolton Hockey Club's former members, Andy Bull, was on the England national squad for 2009/2010 and Great Britain Team for the Men’s Four Nations Tournament. The team currently has a Junior England International playing for the club.

Leagues 

Bolton Hockey Club enters teams in various leagues over the season which include the following:

 North Hockey Men’s League
 Kukri North West Hockey League (Men)
 North Women's Hockey League
 Greater Manchester Hockey Association (Women)
 Bolton Sports Federation Hockey League (Women)

Bolton also enters teams in the following summer leagues

 Bolton Hockey Summer League: Women
 Greater Manchester Summer League: Men's, Women, Mixed
 MHCC Summer League: Men, Women, Mixed

Ladies Teams 
Season 2010/2011

Men’s Teams

League results

References

External links 
Bolton Hockey Club Website
Bolton Hockey Club FB page

English field hockey clubs
Sport in the Metropolitan Borough of Bolton
Field hockey clubs established in 1965
1965 establishments in England